Starkey United Methodist Church is a historic United Methodist church located at Starkey in Yates County, New York. It is a Greek Revival style structure built about 1828.

It was listed on the National Register of Historic Places in 1994.

References

Churches on the National Register of Historic Places in New York (state)
United Methodist churches in New York (state)
Greek Revival church buildings in New York (state)
Churches completed in 1828
19th-century Methodist church buildings in the United States
Churches in Yates County, New York
National Register of Historic Places in Yates County, New York